The Treaty of Andernach was agreed in December 1474 by the Holy Roman Emperor, Frederick III, several princes of the Empire, and the King of France, Louis XI.

Reference 

Andernach (1474)
Andernach (1474)
France–Holy Roman Empire relations
1470s treaties
1470s in the Holy Roman Empire
1470s in France
1474 in Europe